Aaliyah is the third and final studio album by American R&B singer Aaliyah. It was released on July 7, 2001, by Blackground Records and Virgin Records. Because of its packaging design, it is also known as "The Red Album".

Aaliyah started to work on the album in 1998, but rescheduled its recording around her developing film career. She resumed recording in 2000 at Sing Sing Studios in Australia, where she shot her role for the 2002 film Queen of the Damned during the day and recorded songs at night. Additional recording took place at Manhattan Center and Sony Music Studios in New York and Westlake Recording Studios in Los Angeles, among other locations. Through her recording contract with Blackground, the singer worked primarily with the record label's in-house crew of writers and producers, including Bud'da, J. Dub, Rapture, and Eric Seats, as well as longtime collaborator Timbaland.

Aaliyah is described in critical commentaries as an album of R&B, neo soul, and dance-pop, while drawing on an array of other genres such as funk, hip hop, alternative rock, electronica, and Latin music. The album's producers incorporated synthesizer melodies, fragmented beats, distorted guitar, and eccentrically manipulated vocals and song structures, while much of the lyrics were written by singer-songwriter Static Major, who shared a close friendship and strong rapport with Aaliyah. The resulting songs deal with the complexities of romantic love and different stages in a relationship, such as infatuation, eroticism, conflict, infidelity, and heartbreak. Aaliyah viewed the album as a reflection of herself as both a young adult and a matured vocalist.

On release, Aaliyah received highly positive reviews and charted at number two on the US Billboard 200, but sold diminishingly afterwards. When Blackground and Virgin wanted a high-charting single to increase the album's sales, Aaliyah shot a music video for the song "Rock the Boat" in the Bahamas, but died in a plane crash during a return flight to the US on August 25. After her death, sales of the album greatly increased and led it to the top of the Billboard 200, eventually reaching more than 13 million copies sold worldwide. Released during a period of peak activity in R&B, the album has since been cited by critics as one of the genre's best and most influential records from this era. After years of internal and legal conflicts between Blackground, the singer's estate, and the album's creators, Aaliyah was released to music streaming services for the first time in 2021.

Background 

Aaliyah recorded her second album One in a Million with producer-songwriters Timbaland and Missy Elliott, releasing it in 1996 to commercial success, and graduated from high school the following year. She gained achieved further success with hit songs from film soundtracks, including her 1998 single "Are You That Somebody?" Recording again with Timbaland for the song, Aaliyah experimented with more avant-garde sounds in her R&B and pop music, while singing in a low-register and minimalist style distinct from her vocally-virtuosic female contemporaries. After it became the biggest hit of her career at that point, the singer wanted to keep a lower profile and avoid overexposure.

A third album was planned for February 1999, but Aaliyah postponed its recording to develop an acting career, which led to a starring role in the 2000 film Romeo Must Die. The film heightened her profile significantly, while the soundtrack's single "Try Again" became her first number-one song on the pop charts. Her label Blackground Records used the film and its soundtrack to set up a distribution deal with Virgin Records America, which would distribute Blackground's subsequent releases globally.

Recording and production 
Aaliyah began recording the album in 1998. She recorded a few songs, including two with Timbaland, before working on Romeo Must Die. In 1999, while working on the record in New York City, Aaliyah called and asked Trent Reznor, one of her musical idols, to produce a song, but they could not coordinate their schedules. She intended to finish the album by the end of 2000 and resumed its recording while filming in Australia for Queen of the Damned (2002), as she shot her part for the film during the day and recorded songs at night. She said in an interview for Billboard, "there were nights when I didn't go into the studio—I was too tired. On the weekends, I always made it." Jomo Hankerson, Blackground president and Aaliyah's cousin, said that he had to "bribe the producers", who did not want to "go halfway around the world!" He added that they ultimately had "a beautiful time ... making hot music".

Most of the album's songs were recorded at either Sony Studios in New York City or Sing Sing Studios in Melbourne, including "Loose Rap", which was done at both studios. Aaliyah recorded "More Than a Woman" at Manhattan Center Studios, "U Got Nerve" at Soundtracks Studios in New York City, "We Need a Resolution" at Westlake Studios, and "I Care 4 U" at Magic Mix Studios and Music Grinder Studios in Los Angeles. She had first recorded "I Care 4 U", written by Elliott, in 1996 for One in a Million, but scrapped it after that album's completion. Aaliyah worked with Blackground Records' in-house crew of musicians, songwriters, and producers, including novice producers Bud'da, J. Dub, Rapture, and Eric Seats. Music manager Jimmy Henchman, a friend of Aaliyah's manager Barry Hankerson, helped coordinate the record's production and arranged for the producers and writers to work with the singer.

Most of the album's lyrics were written by Static, from the R&B band Playa. While the band was growing apart, he was invited by Blackground to be a lead writer for the album after writing "Are You That Somebody?" and "Try Again". Static was a part of Aaliyah's close group of friends, which included Missy Elliott and Timbaland, and shared an infatuation with her. He found Aaliyah to be ideal for his songwriting style, while she believed that he could accurately portray her feelings. A subtly sexual lyricist, he wrote "Rock the Boat" for her in 1999, but Blackground felt she was not ready for the song. Barry Hankerson said of his songwriting, "We always were protective over every lyric ... But he did things where you never felt offended. You just felt like you overheard someone thinking ... he was clever ... Aaliyah depended on him [and] he depended on her." Elliott said that he was "a part of that bridge of Aaliyah growing up lyrically". While she discussed the lyrics with Static, the singer consulted Bud'da about the sound and musical direction of the album. She was interested in learning about the UK garage scene at the time.

In March 2001, Aaliyah finished recording the album after having filmed her part in Queen of the Damned for four months, which ultimately delayed the album's release. MTV Newss Gideon Yago reported that she completed its last song on March 9, and the album as a whole was mastered by Bernie Grundman at his studio in Los Angeles.

While in Australia, Aaliyah also did a photo shoot for the album with photographers Jeff Dunas, Jonathan Mannion, David LaChapelle, and Albert Watson. The singer handled five pythons at the shoot and developed an affinity for snakes, finding them "dangerous, but quite beautiful" and representative of her on the album. She revisited the snake theme in her music video for "We Need a Resolution" in April 2001 and told MTV, "They live in solitude, [and] there are times in my life [when] I just want to be by myself. There are times I can't even figure myself out. I feel they are very complex creatures, [but] at the same time, they're sexy, too. That's why they represent Aaliyah pretty well." Ultimately, Watson's photo of Aaliyah posing directly at the camera was chosen by artwork designer Warren Fu to be the front cover, with Watson later explaining that it especially demonstrated "a symmetrical composition ... with a look of confidence and maturity." Of the album itself, Aaliyah called it "a good reflection of [myself] and the person [I am] today", saying in an interview for Jet magazine, "I am a young adult now, and I think this album shows my growth vocally."

Music and lyrics 

An R&B and neo soul album, Aaliyah features midtempo funk songs, hip hop-textured uptempo tracks, and slow jams that draw on older soul influences. Along with contemporary urban sounds, the music incorporates Middle-Eastern influences, muted alternative rock, and—particularly on Timbaland's songs for the album—Latin timbres. "Never No More" mixes both older soul and modern hip hop sounds with string arrangements by producer Bud'da, while "Read Between the Lines" is a rhythmic, digital samba with Latin percussion. Aaliyahs production features synthesizer melodies, vintage syndrums, distorted guitar, staccato arrangements, and layered, eccentrically manipulated vocals. John Mulvey of NME finds its sound subtle and lacking "bombast and histrionics", while the magazine's Alex Needham likens its "otherworldly", high frequency production to dub reggae and the dark, spacious dance music of Dr. Dre and Massive Attack. In Stephen Thomas Erlewine's opinion, the album is distinct from the older soul leanings of Macy Gray and Jill Scott, as its music sounds unconventional yet modern, "turning out a pan-cultural array of sounds, styles, and emotions".

Aaliyahs beats are produced in a manner that makes them sound fragmented, exhibiting techno and electro textures. Tracks such as "Loose Rap", "Extra Smooth", and "What If" feature unconventional song structures experimenting with resolution. "I Can Be" and "What If" incorporate 2-step and rock elements, although the latter song draws particularly from Detroit techno and industrial rock. On the club-influenced "More Than a Woman", Aaliyah's vocal harmonies interplay against minor key string and guitar sounds, while "Loose Rap" features underwater noises, low-key electronica in the style of the Neptunes, and harmonically soft vocals declaring "it ain't just rhythm and blues". Ernest Hardy of Rolling Stone compares the album's experimentation to the sounds on Outkast's Stankonia (2000), Sade's Lovers Rock (2000), and Missy Elliott's Miss E... So Addictive (2001). According to Slant Magazines Sal Cinquemani, "like Elliott's genre-bending So Addictive, Aaliyah provides a missing link between hip-hop and electronica."

The lyrics on Aaliyah explore the intricacies of romantic love and phases in a relationship such as frivolous infatuation, issues near the end of a relationship, and heartache. Subtle, lighthearted humor and witty sound effects, such as comical vocal manipulation, intersperse the themes of heartbreak and eroticism. According to Citysearch's Justin Hartung, the record "transforms the confusion of young adulthood into exhilarating freedom", while Billboards Rashaun Hall says that each song possess a unique emotional identity that accompanies the music's sonic variety. Bob Waliszewski of Plugged In observes female empowerment-themed songs that show a "healthy self-respect" by Aaliyah, who "doesn't put up with unfaithful cads ('U Got Nerve'), mind games ('I Refuse'), self-impressed hunks ('Extra Smooth'), gossip and envy ('Loose Rap'), or physical abuse ('Never No More')". The key-shifting, drum and bass-influenced "Extra Smooth" addresses an enthusiastic courtship and is inspired by a conversation between Aaliyah and Static about how men try to act suave, while "Loose Rap" is titled after the slang phrase of the same name and dismisses romantic admirers who use trite pick-up lines. "Those Were the Days" dispassionately dismisses a male lover, while "What If" angrily threatens an unfaithful lover and by extension similar men. On "I Care 4 U", the narrator tries to console a friend who is heartbroken, but finds herself distressed by unrequited feelings she has for him.

Aaliyah's vocals are sung in a restrained soprano style throughout the album. Vibe magazine's Hyun Kim argues that its songs draw focus to her singing more than her previous records, "bringing it to the forefront as opposed to hiding it behind the layered production". "Rock the Boat" is sung with breathless vocals by Aaliyah, who instructs her lover on how to please her sexually and equates her erotic high to a drug high. Ballads such as "I Care 4 U", "Never No More", and "I Refuse" are sung more emotively, expressing melancholy qualities and hurt. On "I Can Be", Aaliyah sings from the perspective of an adulterous man's mistress who wants to be his foremost girlfriend. Alex Macpherson from The Guardian wrote that "Aaliyah's blank, numbed delivery" on the song "makes being the other woman seem like an emotionally masochistic form of self-medication". Biographer Christopher John Farley says that she "emotionally detail[s] a song" unlike on her previous albums and that "her gentle voice now seem[s] like something elemental, a kindly wind blowing through the branches of a big tree." According to Joshua Clover, Aaliyah pushes musical notes "into strange corners of syncopation's shifty architecture" on the more "shape-defying" tracks. Overall, "she makes the sonics tell the story, creating meaning outside the lyrics, pleasure beyond the hooks."

Marketing and sales 

Aaliyah was originally issued by Blackground and Virgin in Japan on July 7, 2001, before its release in the United Kingdom on July 16 and in the United States on July 17. In the US, it debuted at number two on the Billboard 200 albums chart behind Songs in A Minor by Alicia Keys, selling 187,000 copies in the week of August 4. Although it was the highest sales week of Aaliyah's career, the album sold diminishingly over the next two months. The singer planned to embark on the largest concert tour of her career to support the album, while Blackground and Virgin—heavily invested in the record's success—wanted a single with a high chart placement to help increase sales. "We Need a Resolution" had been released as the lead single on April 13, but did not receive significant radio airplay and only reached number fifty-nine on the Billboard Hot 100.

In August 2001, Aaliyah filmed a music video for "More Than a Woman" in Los Angeles and then travelled to the Bahamas to shoot a video for "Rock the Boat". But after its completion, she and several crew members who were returning to the US died in a plane crash on August 25. Blackground executives were uncertain when they would release the album's next single and video. Aaliyah had sold more than 447,000 copies by this point.

The album's sales increased rapidly after Aaliyah died. News of her death was reported on the last day of Nielsen SoundScan's sales tracking week, during which Aaliyah sold 62,000 copies, a 41.5% increase from its past week's sales. The following week, it sold 305,500 copies and ascended from number 19 to number one on the Billboard 200, making it the record's highest sales week. It was Aaliyah's only album to top any of Billboards charts and marked the first time a recording artist climbed to number one posthumously since John Lennon in 1980 with his album Double Fantasy. On September 19, Aaliyah reached more than one million copies sold. In November, "Rock the Boat" was released as a single and reached number two on the R&B/Hip-Hop chart that same month. In the US, Aaliyah spent 69 weeks on the Billboard 200, reaching 2.06 million copies sold by February 25, 2002, and 2.6 million sold by December 2009.

Blackground, which had ended its joint deal with Virgin in November 2001, wanted to send the video for "More Than a Woman" (released on September 4) to domestic outlets, but it required both labels to work together. Blackground subsequently moved to Universal Records, and the video was first aired in Europe. In the UK, "More Than a Woman" was released as a single on January 7, 2002, and entered the singles chart at number one, while Aaliyah re-entered the albums chart at number 65; it had originally entered the chart at number 25 on July 28, 2001. Two weeks after "More Than a Woman" reached number one, the album jumped 17 spots to number five on January 27, 2002. Aaliyah went on to spend 36 weeks on the British charts. According to the Official Charts Company, the album sold a total of 303,000 copies in the UK. It also reached number nine on the record charts in France, Germany, and the Netherlands, where it charted for 33, 41, and 46 weeks, respectively. According to the International Federation of the Phonographic Industry (IFPI), the record was the 34th best-selling album in the world during 2001. In August 2012, NME writer Tom Goodwyn reported that it had sold more than 13 million copies worldwide.

Critical reception 

Aaliyah was met with highly positive reviews from most critics. At Metacritic, which assigns a normalized rating out of 100 to reviews from professional publications, the album received an average score of 76, based on 14 reviews. According to Pitchforks Rawija Kameir, reviewers praised the singer for deviating from the "candy-coated" quality of contemporary pop music in favor of an approach that perfectly balanced pop, R&B, and hip hop. Rashaun Hall from Billboard felt that Aaliyah was taking a different approach in comparison to her pop/R&B peers, who "crank out happy-go-lucky albums year after year". He deemed the album as a "sonically diverse set in which each number has an emotion all its own".

Reviewing for The Guardian in July 2001, Michael Odell called Aaliyah a flawless blend of pop and R&B, "as much a brochure for the current state of R&B production facilities" as it is a showcase for its namesake's singing. He found the music's textures "scintillating" and believed its distinguishing characteristic to be "a playful and confident reworking of the [R&B] canon". In the Chicago Tribune, Brad Cawn wrote that Aaliyah demonstrates Sade's grace and Missy Elliott's daring with fashionable neo soul that is "equal parts attitude and harmony, and all urban music perfection", while Russell Baillie from The New Zealand Herald deemed the music innovative dance-pop on what he called "a cohesive, detailed and disarmingly enticing album". Simon Price, writing for The Independent, cited the record as "further evidence that black pop is the avant garde". In a review for The A.V. Club, Nathan Rabin argued that the album establishes Aaliyah as a significant artist unobscured by her collaborators, while Hardy from Rolling Stone called it "a near-flawless declaration of strength and independence" in which Aaliyah explores her "fantasies and strengths". Writing for Spin, Clover viewed the record as her most profound work and said she had made "art" out of Timbaland and Static's "formal finesse" by "investing sound schemes with urgency and emotional intricacy".

Some reviewers were more qualified in their praise. Mulvey deemed Aaliyah "graceful" and "satisfying rather than extraordinary" in his review for NME. Although he said it is redeemed by Static's consistent songwriting, Timbaland should have contributed more songs, in his opinion. Like Mulvey, Q remarked that its music is decent rather than innovative, with some filler. In Entertainment Weekly, Craig Seymour wrote that there are a few songs that stray from her musical strengths, but elsewhere she "skillfully portrays love as part woozy thrill, part pulse-racing terror". Robert Christgau in The Village Voice named "We Need a Resolution" and "U Got Nerve" as highlights and called Aaliyah "a slave to her beats, but a proud slave". Connie Johnson from the Los Angeles Times was more critical, finding the production unadventurous and the lyrics lacking the depth and "personal revelation that gives music some immediacy". E! Online felt that although the album is "not as immediate as some of her past mainstream work", she "pushes the boundaries of her voice and her age". Ultimately the publication praised Aaliyah for "slowly working her way through R&B, hip-hop and even slightly techno beats". Although Luke McManus from the Irish publication RTÉ felt the album was too long, he praised it saying it was "the smoothest and most seductive R'n'B album of the year, with lyrics that are appealingly upfront and assertive".

Aaliyah was named the best album of 2001 by Slant Magazine and one of the ten best records of the year by The Atlanta Journal-Constitution and Time magazine. NME ranked it at number 39 on their year-end list. The album finished 73rd in the Pazz & Jop, an annual poll of American critics published by The Village Voice. Christgau, who created and supervised the poll, said in his accompanying essay that Aaliyah had finally "developed material nobody can deny" on "a good album". The record also finished 37th in the annual poll run by German music magazine Spex. For the album, Aaliyah was posthumously awarded an NAACP Image Award for Outstanding Female Artist. At the 2002 American Music Awards, it won in the category of Favorite R&B/Soul Album. In 2002, Aaliyah received a Grammy Award nomination for Best R&B Album. "Rock the Boat" was nominated for Best Female R&B Vocal Performance. "More Than a Woman" was nominated in the same category in 2003.

Legacy and influence 

Along with Aaliyah's burgeoning film career, the album was a part of her rising mainstream success in 2001. In a retrospective review, Steve Huey from AllMusic called it her most consummate record and said it "completed the singer's image overhaul into a sensual yet sensitive adult". Erlewine, the website's senior editor, regarded the album as "a statement of maturity and a stunning artistic leap forward", while BBC Musics Daryl Easlea felt it made Aaliyah's two previous accomplished albums "look like exercises in juvenilia". According to PopMatters journalist Quentin B. Huff, she had never used her singing to complement her music's innovative production before with as much variety, conviction, and success as on Aaliyah, which he said was also known as "The Red Album" because of its red artwork. Huff believed the record showcased the growing rapport between the singer and her collaborators while disproving questions about how she would continue recording music while broadening her profile. In The New Rolling Stone Album Guide (2004), Keith Harris wrote that "Aaliyah had grown from studio puppet to a powerful R&B archetype—a more self-aware Ronnie Spector for a time that requires more self-awareness of its young adults."

Aaliyah's re-emergence with the album in mid-2001 coincided with a period of peak activity in contemporary R&B, as well as the popularity of neo soul. According to Erlewine, Aaliyah was "one of the strongest urban soul records of its time", while The Guardian cited it as the peak of R&B's golden age at the "turn of the century". Alexis Petridis, the newspaper's lead critic, believed Aaliyah had recorded her most engaging music in a year when R&B and hip hop demonstrated the most creativity in popular music. In 2005, the Aaliyah album ranked 66th on GQs "100 Coolest Albums in the World", while Stylus Magazine placed it at number 47 in the "Top 50 Albums of 2000–2005"; the publication's David Drake ranked it eighth on his own list. A few years later, it was named one of Vibe magazine's "150 Essential Albums of the Vibe Era", and at the end of the decade, it placed at number 72 on Slant Magazines list of the best albums from the 2000s. Writing for Vibes list, Jon Caramanica believed Aaliyah "may be the best soul album of the young millennium" and yet "redefines the category" with music that is "daring in construction, gorgeous from conception ... damn near post-R&B". The album was ranked number 77 on NPR's "The 150 Greatest Albums Made By Women" list and according to writer Stacia Irons, "Aaliyah became a catalyst and bridge that created a smooth transition from '90s style R&B into Modern PBR&B".

Aaliyah helped establish the "beat"-based sound of R&B during the 2000s while impacting a new wave of black progressive musicians. As The Independents Micha Frazer-Carroll writes, acts such as Destiny's Child, Ashanti, Amerie, and Cassie capitalized on the success of the album's "idiosyncratic sound", while Aaliyah's "pared-back vocal phrasing" established an archetype for a "more stoic R&B singer" that would influence vocalists like Ciara and Rihanna. Timbaland's commercial success with R&B-influenced singers such as Justin Timberlake and Nelly Furtado during the decade was later attributed by The Guardians Rebecca Nicholson to his experience producing Aaliyah, writing that he "hasn't come close to creating anything as sonically stunning since". Q journalist Eve Barlow credited the album in 2011 for "creating a blueprint that can be heard across pop music today" with acts such as R&B singers Beyoncé and The Weeknd, and the indie pop band The xx. According to Kameir, Aaliyah's characteristic multi-part harmonies on the album foreshadowed those of Solange Knowles.

The recording sessions for the Aaliyah album produced many leftover tracks that were posthumously archived by Blackground and mostly left unreleased because of internal conflicts and legal complications between the label, Aaliyah's family, and the producers. Six of these recordings were released in 2002 on the compilation album I Care 4 U. Blackground's subsequent decline and mismanagement of the singer's catalog resulted in the Aaliyah album's unavailability on streaming services in the next decade, leading Kameir to say in 2019 that, "paradoxically to its significance, the legacy of Aaliyah is now diminished". That year, The Guardian ranked it number 28 on a list of the 100 best albums from the 21st century, making it the list's only album absent from streaming services. The newspaper's music editor, Ben Beaumont-Thomas, wrote in an accompanying blurb: "This album is lauded for the three masterpieces Aaliyah made with Timbaland—Try Again, More Than a Woman and We Need a Resolution—that lend a serpentine malevolence to her voice, but there are also strong old-school jams and languorous ballads. Lesser R&B stars match their voice to the beat—Aaliyah's genius, tragically cut short when she was killed in a plane crash, was to slink through it with an almost Latin sense of rhythm."

In August 2021, it was reported that the album and Aaliyah's other recorded work for Blackground (since rebranded as Blackground Records 2.0) would be rereleased on physical, digital, and streaming formats in a deal between the record label and Empire Distribution. However, Aaliyah's estate issued a statement in response to Blackground 2.0's announcement, denouncing the "unscrupulous endeavor to release Aaliyah's music without any transparency or full accounting to the estate". On September 10, Aaliyah appeared on streaming and music download services through Blackground and Empire. In the following weeks, it reentered the US Billboard 200 at number 13 and the UK R&B albums chart at number seven.

Track listing

Personnel 
Information is taken from the album credits.

 Aaliyah – executive production, vocals
 Jonathan Adler – engineering assistance (tracks 7, 8)
 The Black Orchestra – strings (track 5)
 Stevie Blacke – strings
 Ron Blake – horn (track 8)
 Chandler Bridges – engineering assistance (tracks 2, 3, 9)
 Bud'da – mixing, production (tracks 5, 8, 12)
 Michael Conrader – engineering (tracks 2, 5, 8, 9)
 Sean Cruse – guitar (track 12)
 J. Dub – instrumentation, production, programming (tracks 10, 14)
 Jimmy Douglass – engineering, mixing (tracks 1, 4, 6)
 Jeff Dunas – photography
 Missy Elliott – writing
 Warren Fu – art direction
 Ben Garrison – mixing (tracks 2, 3, 7-9, 11)
 Bernie Grundman – mastering
 Barry Hankerson – executive production
 Jomo Hankerson – executive production
 Richard "Segal" Huredia – mixing
 Dino "The Cut" Johnson – mixing (track 13)
 Acar Keys – engineering (tracks 2, 3, 7, 11, 13)
 David LaChapelle – photography
 Michelle Lynn-Forbes – engineering assistance (tracks 5, 12)
 Jonathan Mannion – photography
 Tim Olmstead – engineering assistance (track 11)
 Steve Penny – engineering assistance (track 4)
 Renzo Pryor – keyboards (track 5)
 Pat Sajack – engineering assistance (tracks 10, 14)
 Eric Seats – instrumentation, production, writing (tracks 2, 3, 7, 9, 11, 13)
 Richard Segal-Huredia – mixing (tracks 5, 12)
 Static – vocals, writing
 Rapture – instrumentation, production, writing (tracks 2, 3, 7, 9, 11, 13)
 Timbaland – mixing, production (tracks 1, 4), vocals
 Roberto "Gary" Walker – engineering assistance (track 2)
 Albert Watson – photography
 Scott Wolfe – engineer, mixing (tracks 10, 12, 14)
 Michael Zainer – engineering assistance (track 4)

Charts

Weekly charts

Year-end charts

Decade-end charts

Certifications

Release history

See also 
 Album era
 Alternative R&B
 List of number-one albums of 2001 (U.S.)
 Progressive soul

Notes

References

Bibliography

Further reading

External links 
 Aaliyah at Acclaimed Music (list of accolades)
 

2001 albums
Aaliyah albums
Virgin Records albums
Neo soul albums
Albums produced by Bud'da
Albums produced by Timbaland
Albums recorded at Westlake Recording Studios